"Byker Hill" is a traditional English folk song about coal miners, Roud 3488  that has been performed by many contemporary acts. There are at least three different tunes to which the song is sung.

Byker Hill is in the east end of Newcastle, as is the adjoining district of Walker, also mentioned in the song. "Byker Hill and Walker Shore, Collier lads for ever more"

The earliest versions of this song use the title "Walker Pits" as in the publication Rhymes of Northern Bards (1812) where it is song number 36. 
It was included in A.L. Lloyd's collection "Come all ye bold miners", still with the earlier title.

Notable versions of "Byker Hill"
 Martin Carthy on his 1967 album "Byker Hill" 
 Dave Swarbrick on "Swarbrick" (1976) 
 Tempest - on Shapeshifter, re-released on Prime Cuts
 Dave Van Ronk - on Going Back To Brooklyn (as "Luang Prabang")
 Patrick Sky - on Songs That Made America Famous (as "Luang Prabang")
 The Barely Works - on The Big Beat
 Australian Chamber Orchestra with Danny Spooner, Mike Kerin & Richard Tognetti
 The Imagined Village
 The Cottars - on Forerunner
 The Young Tradition
 Sportive Tricks - on their album Old Dogs New Tricks
 Pete Coe
 Bellowhead on Broadside
Philip Wilby
Boiled in Lead, on the 1985 album BOiLeD iN lEaD
 Brian Johnson, on the 2002 album From Tyne to Tweed - The Northumbria Anthology
 Chanticleer, on The Anniversary Album
 Steve Goodman - Live at University of Illinois, November 10, 1969
 The Lawrence Arms (as "Luang Prabang")

References

English folk music
Songs related to Newcastle upon Tyne
Coal mining in England
Geography of Newcastle upon Tyne